Bjørn Maars Johnsen (born 6 November 1991) is a professional footballer who plays as a forward for Dutch club Cambuur and the Norway national team.

Early life
Born in New York City to a Norwegian father and an African American mother, Johnsen grew up in North Carolina and attended Needham B. Broughton High School in Raleigh, where he played on the school's soccer team.

Club career

Early career
Johnsen started his football career in Vålerenga and Tønsberg, staying there for two seasons, After leaving Tønsberg he went to Andalusia, to the CD Úbeda Viva there Johnsen became the first foreigner in the history of the club, remained close to three months, played four game and scored a goal before signing fourth tier Spanish team Antequera in January 2012. Eight months later, on 5 August 2012, Johnsen joined Segunda División B side Atlético Baleares, where he played alongside Walter Pandiani.

Atlético CP
On 17 July 2014, Johnsen signed with Portuguese club Atlético CP on a two-year deal. In August, he won the award for Player of the Month in the Segunda Liga, after scoring nine goals in five games.
His strong performances saw him being scouted by such teams as Benfica, Sporting CP and Belenenses, but the transfer never arrived. According to the Portuguese press Benfica offered €300,000 plus two of their players, but Atletico wanted €500,000 and thus rejected the offer.

Litex Lovech
After half a season, 31 matches and 16 goals with Atletico, Johnsen joined the Bulgarian team Litex Lovech for two and a half years. He made his debut on 28 February 2015 in a home win against Ludogorets Razgrad. On 23 May he scored a hat trick in a match against Ludogorets for a 4–2 win. On 12 December 2015, he was sent off after an altercation with Miguel Bedoya in an ill-tempered A PFG match against Levski Sofia that was eventually abandoned after the Litex players were ordered off the pitch.

Heart of Midlothian
On 22 July 2016, Johnsen completed a move to Scottish Premiership side Heart of Midlothian, on a three-year deal. He made his debut on 20 August 2016, appearing as a substitute in a 5–1 victory over Inverness Caledonian Thistle played at Tynecastle, where he assisted a Sam Nicholson goal with one of his first touches.

ADO Den Haag

Johnsen moved to ADO Den Haag for an undisclosed fee on 31 July 2017. In his first season he scored 19 goals in 34 official matches.

AZ Alkmaar
After a great season at ADO Den Haag, Johnsen transferred to AZ Alkmaar in 2018. His performance was substandard leading to a half-year loan spell at Rosenborg BK.

Ulsan Hyundai FC 
On 6 January 2020, Johnsen signed a three-year contract with K League side Ulsan Hyundai FC.

CF Montreal 
On 3 February 2021, Johnsen signed with MLS club CF Montreal.

International career
Due to his dual nationality, Johnsen was able to play for both Norway and the United States. Johnsen made his Norway debut in June 2017.

Career statistics

Club

International

Scores and results list Norway's goal tally first, score column indicates score after each Johnsen goal.

Honours 
Ulsan Hyundai
 AFC Champions League: 2020

Individual
 SJPF Segunda Liga Player of the Month: August 2014, September 2014
 Scottish Premiership Player of the Month: November 2016

References

External links
 
 
 

1991 births
Living people
Soccer players from North Carolina
Norwegian footballers
Association football forwards
Norway international footballers
American soccer players
Norwegian people of African-American descent
American people of Norwegian descent
Liga Portugal 2 players
First Professional Football League (Bulgaria) players
Scottish Professional Football League players
Eredivisie players
Vålerenga Fotball players
Antequera CF footballers
CD Atlético Baleares footballers
Louletano D.C. players
Atlético Clube de Portugal players
PFC Litex Lovech players
Heart of Midlothian F.C. players
ADO Den Haag players
AZ Alkmaar players
Ulsan Hyundai FC players
CF Montréal players
Norwegian expatriate footballers
Norwegian expatriate sportspeople in Spain
Expatriate footballers in Spain
Norwegian expatriate sportspeople in Portugal
Expatriate footballers in Portugal
Norwegian expatriate sportspeople in Bulgaria
Expatriate footballers in Bulgaria
Norwegian expatriate sportspeople in Scotland
Expatriate footballers in Scotland
Norwegian expatriate sportspeople in the Netherlands
Expatriate footballers in the Netherlands
Major League Soccer players